The Southern Great Lakes lowland forests is a temperate broadleaf and mixed forest ecoregion of North America, as defined by the World Wildlife Fund.  Located near the Great Lakes, it lies mostly in the central northeastern United States and extends into southeast central Canada.  In modern times, little of it remains intact due to land use, including agriculture and urban uses.

Setting
This area includes the southern half of Michigan's Lower Peninsula, and much of Indiana and Ohio.  It also extends through the southern half of Southwest Ontario from Windsor to Toronto and into Pennsylvania and New York on the southern rims of lakes Erie and Ontario. 

This region is characterized by warm-to-hot summers and mild-to-cold, snowy winters.

Flora
This ecoregion is associated with the temperate deciduous forest to the south and thus contained a variety of habitats including freshwater marshes, dunes, bogs, fens, and hardwood and conifer swamps.

Fauna
The Southern Great Lakes forests were very rich in wildlife. Birds include cardinals, downy woodpecker, wood duck and eastern screech owl. Large mammals including American black bear (Ursus americanus), moose (Alces alces), Canada lynx (Lynx canadensis), cougar (Puma concolor), caribou (Rangifer tarandus), elk (Cervus canadensis) and eastern wolf (Canis lycaon) have been mostly or completely extirpated from this ecoregion; remaining mammals include white-tailed deer (Odocoileus virginianus), coyote (Canis latrans), snowshoe hare (Lepus americanus), eastern chipmunk (Tamias striatus), American red squirrel (Tamiasciurus hudsonicus) and eastern gray squirrel (Sciurus carolinensis).

Threats and preservation

Because of extensive urbanization and agricultural use very little of this habitat remains intact.

See also
 List of ecoregions in Canada (WWF)
 List of ecoregions in the United States (WWF)

References

External links
 Central U.S. hardwood forests images at bioimages.vanderbilt.edu
 Southern Great Lakes forests

Temperate broadleaf and mixed forests in the United States
Ecoregions of the United States
Flora of the Great Lakes region (North America)
Plant communities of New York (state)